National Route 402 (N402) forms part of the Philippine highway network. It runs through the rural municipalities of Cavite.

Route description 
N402 covers the Tanza to Tagaytay segment of Noveleta–Naic–Tagaytay Road, according to the Department of Public Works and Highways.

Tanza to Naic 

N402 starts at N64 (Antero Soriano Highway) as Santa Cruz Street, a one-way street into the población of Tanza. In front of the entrance to the Diocesan Shrine of Saint Augustine, it then turns southwest as San Agustin Street, becomes a two-way street at its intersection with Santo Domingo Street. It meets the Biwas Roundabout past the Tanza Bridge, and once again meets Antero Soriano Highway at the Tanza Junction and proceeds towards Naic.

Naic to Indang

Within the población of Naic, N402 turns southwest towards J. Poblete Street (some of its segments is also known as Sabang Road) and then, in front of the Naic Church, veers southeast as Capt. Ciriaco Nazareno Street. It then intersects with Governor's Drive and proceeds towards Indang as Naic–Indang Road. It then enters the población of Indang alternatively known as A. Mojica Street and ends at De Ocampo Street. It then continues as De Ocampo Street, San Miguel Street, and A. Mabini Street, veers southeast in front of Indang Church as San Gregorio Street, and continues as San Gregorio Extension.

Indang to Mendez 

At the end of San Gregorio Extension, the road intersects Trece Martires–Indang Road and proceeds southeast towards Mendez as Indang–Mendez Road. It then enters the municipality of Mendez, where it becomes a one-way southbound street known as C. Llamado Street and Osorio Street before ending at the latter's junction with J.P. Rizal Street in Mendez población.

Mendez to Tagaytay 

At the junction of J.P. Rizal and Osorio Streets, the road proceeds southeast towards Tagaytay as Mendez–Tagaytay Road. The Tagaytay segment is also known as Tagaytay–Cavite via Mendez Road. It finally terminates at Tagaytay–Nasugbu Highway at Mendez Crossing, Tagaytay.

Intersections

References 

Roads in Cavite